Andrija Radulović (born 3 July 2002) is a Montenegrin professional footballer who currently plays as a forward for Serbian club Radnik Surdulica, on loan from Red Star Belgrade.

Career statistics

Club

Honours

Red Star Belgrade
 Serbian SuperLiga (3): 2019–20, 2020–21, 2021–22
 Serbian Cup (2): 2020–21, 2021–22

References

2002 births
Living people
People from Kotor
Association football forwards
Serbian footballers
Serbia youth international footballers
Montenegrin footballers
Montenegro youth international footballers
Red Star Belgrade footballers
Serbian SuperLiga players
Serbs of Montenegro